University of Visvesvaraya College of Engineering (UVCE) was established in 1917, under the name Government Engineering College, by Bharat Ratna Sir M. Visvesvaraya. It is the fifth engineering college to be established in the country and first in Karnataka. UVCE is one of the few technical institutions in the country that is vested with the status of a university and autonomy on the lines of IITs. It is one of the oldest technical institutions in the country, imparting technical education leading to B.Tech., B. Arch., M.Tech., M. Arch. and PhD degrees in the various disciplines of Engineering and Architecture. The college is approved by the AICTE and the Government of Karnataka. UVCE has secured an NAAC accreditation score of 3.17 (A Grade). The college used to receive financial aid under the TEQIP program from the World Bank.

B. Muthuraman has been appointed as the first chairman of the Board of Governors at UVCE.

History

In 1917, the then Diwan of Mysore, Sir M. Visvesvaraya, felt the need to have an engineering college in the state as the College of Engineering, Guindy and College of Engineering, Pune were unable to accommodate enough students from Mysore State.

He started the college in 1917 in Bangalore as a School of Engineering with 20 students in Civil and Mechanical engineering branches in the PWD building. S.V. Setty was a founding professor. It was the fifth engineering college to be started in India and the first one in the Mysore State. In 1965, the name of the college was changed to University Visvesvaraya College of Engineering (UVCE), after the founder.

UVCE has been affiliated to Bangalore University since 1964. Dr. Venugopal K R, UVCE alumni, Principal UVCE and Vice Chancellor Bangalore University was the Special Officer to the Government of Karnataka for Trifurcating Bangalore University. He submitted the report on 26 March 2015 for restructuring Bangalore University into Bangalore University, Bengaluru City University and Bengaluru North University and UVCE to be carved out as Center of Excellence on the model of Indian Institute of Technology. UVCE was granted autonomy by a bill tabled in Karnataka assembly and now UVCE is an autonomous institution with effect from 25 March 2022.

Campus
UVCE is situated at K.R. Circle and in the neighborhood of Vidhana Soudha, Government of Karnataka, with a campus area spreading over 15 acres, housing the Departments of Mechanical Engineering, Electrical and Electronics Engineering, Electronics and Communication Engineering and Computer Science Engineering. The institute runs the Civil Engineering and Architecture courses at the Jnana Bharathi Campus, occupying an area of about 50 acres.

The college provides hostel facilities for boys and girls separately, both in the Jnana Bharathi and K.R. Circle campus.

Admissions
Candidates who qualify in the Karnataka Common Entrance Test (KCET) / Aptitude test conducted by the Government of Karnataka are eligible for admission to the Under Graduate Engineering / Architecture courses. Candidates belonging to Union Territories / other states are also admitted to the college under the Central Government quota. Candidates who qualify through GATE and PGCET are eligible to the Post Graduate programmes. Candidates who qualify in the test conducted by Bangalore University are eligible for Research programmes leading to M.Tech. in Engineering and Doctoral programmes. Admission to UVCE is strictly done on the basis of merit.

Academics

The institution offers 7 undergraduate (B.Tech. / B. Arch) and 24 postgraduate (M.Tech. / M. Arch.) programmes.

Student life

College events

Civista 
It is a cultural fest organized every year by a Civil Engineering department which is situated in Jnanabharathi Campus

Milagro 
Milagro is the annual inter-collegiate cultural fest that is organized in UVCE. This event draws crowds of up to 2,000 and is organized during March - April.

Inspiron
Since its inception in 2009, Inspiron has been hosted by The Training and Placement Office, UVCE.

Impetus
IMPETUS is a national-level technical extravaganza organised by IEEE UVCE which was started in the year 2001.

Corporate companies like IBM, Yahoo!, NIIT, Motorola, Cognizant, Infosys, DELL etc. and Government organisations like BWSSB and BESCOM sponsor the fest. The event hosts both technical events like Circuit Debugging, OSP, Web Designing, Technical Quiz and non-technical events like Mad Ads, Ad-Venture, Team building event, Marketing event, Mock stock etc.

Kagada
Kagada is a National Level Annual Technical Paper Presentation Contest organized by IEEE UVCE.

Convocation
Every year convocation is held in June, where degrees are awarded to graduating students.

Notable alumni

 Venugopal K R, Former Principal UVCE and Vice Chancellor Bangalore University.
 Venkatesh K. R. Kodur, University professor at Michigan State University and a pioneer in structural fire design.
 Professor S. S. Iyengar, Ryder professor and director of Computer Science at Florida International University, Miami, Florida, USA
 V. K. Aatre, scientist, former head, Defence Research and Development Organisation (DRDO)
 N. Ahmed, Professor Emeritus, Electrical and Computer and Engineering, University of New Mexico
 Narasimhiah Seshagiri Computer scientist, writer and a former director-general of the National Informatics Centre, an apex organization of the Government of India 
 Mano Murthy, entrepreneur and composer
 Roddam Narasimha, eminent scientist
 Lakshmi Narayanan, Ex-CEO at Cognizant
 Katepalli R. Sreenivasan, Former chairman, Mechanical Engineering, Yale University
 H. G. Dattatreya, actor
 Ramesh Arvind, actor
 Vijaya Bhaskar, composer
 Arvind Bhat, badminton player
 Prakash Belawadi, actor
 Prahlada, missile scientist and former Vice Chancellor of DIAT
 G Guruswamy, Principal Aerospace Scientist who pioneered computational aeroelasticity in 1978.
 Rajkumar Buyya, Redmond Barry Distinguished Professor and Director of the Cloud Computing and Distributed Systems (CLOUDS) Laboratory at the University of Melbourne
 V. K. Aatre

IEEE UVCE Fellow awardees
 M A L Thathachar
 S. S. Iyengar
 Viktor Prasanna
 V. Prasad Kodali
 Vasudev Kalkunte Aatre
 Rajkumar Buyya
 Venugopal K R, Former Principal UVCE and Vice Chancellor Bangalore University, IEEE Fellow, ACM Distinguished Educator, for his contributions to "Computer Science and Electrical Engineering Education".
 N. Ahmed, 1985 "for his contributions to engineering education and digital signal processing."

Alumni Associations
Instead of  typically one per institution there are three associations formed by different groups: VisionUVCE, UVCE Foundation, UVCE Centenary Foundation, UVCE Graduates Association, UVCE_ALUMNI.

References

External links
 Official website

1917 establishments in India
Engineering universities and colleges in India